Lakeview Regional Medical Center, a campus of Tulane Medical Center is an affiliate of HCA- a leading national healthcare network with more than 250 hospitals and freestanding surgery centers in 20 states and the United Kingdom. Lakeview Regional is located in Covington, Louisiana and offers advanced medical care to residents of St. Tammany parish, including Lacombe, Covington, Madisonville, Abita Springs and Mandeville. As a campus of Tulane Medical Center, the hospital and emergency room serves Louisiana's Northshore region. Since 1977, the hospital has been a transforming and healing presence in the community as a full-service, acute care hospital providing inpatient and outpatient healthcare services. With its 167 beds, more than 240 physicians and specialists and 800 employees, Lakeview Regional Medical Center offers a full spectrum of services, including a 24/7 Emergency Room, a Heart Center, a Surgical Institute, a Rehabilitation Center and a Behavioral Health Center. Other services provided at this campus include bone and joint care, imaging, pediatric services, spine care services; stroke care, surgical and vascular care; robotic surgeries; and women's and infant services, among others. Lakeview Regional Medical Center continues to reinvest in its facilities and staff to better meet the needs of the growing community, as well as provide the latest in medical innovations in diagnostic and treatment services and state-of-the-art medical equipment.

Tulane University and LCMC announced on October 10, 2022 that LCMC would purchase Tulane Medical Center (along with Lakeview Regional Medical Center, and Tulane Lakeside Hospital) from HCA for $150 Million.

References

External links

Hospitals in Louisiana
Buildings and structures in St. Tammany Parish, Louisiana
Trauma centers